Brenna Harding (born May 19, 1996) is an Australian actress, best known for her role as Sue Knight in the television series Puberty Blues, and her role in "Arkangel", an episode in the anthology series Black Mirror.

Career 
Harding's first television appearance was in 2004, appearing in a clip for Play Schools "Through the Window" segment. The clip showed Harding and her two mothers on a trip to an amusement park, and attracted controversy from the media and politicians for showing homosexual parents.

Harding began performing in the late 2000s through holiday drama courses, then moved on to television roles with an appearance in My Place and a three-episode run in season 3 of Packed to the Rafters. Her first major television role was as Sue Knight in Puberty Blues, one of the two teenage girls who were the main characters of the 1979 novel of the same name. Harding's role in the series led to her receiving the 2013 Logie Award for Most Popular New Female Talent, as well as being nominated for the 2013 Logie Award for Most Outstanding Newcomer, and nominated for the AACTA Award for Best Young Actor at the 2nd AACTA Awards in 2013. In 2017, she appeared in "Arkangel", an episode in the series Black Mirror.

Philanthropy 
Harding is a campaigner for LGBT rights, appearing with her mothers before the 2009 New South Wales parliamentary inquiry into same-sex adoption reform. As of 2012, she was the president of gay rights group "Wear it Purple". She is also credited as one of the authors of the children's books The Rainbow Cubby House, Koalas on Parade, Going to Fair Day and My House, along with her mother Vicki. In 2015, Brenna founded Sydney-based feminist collective Moonlight Feminists.

Filmography

Television

Film

References

External links
 

20th-century Australian actresses
Australian television actresses
Living people
Logie Award winners
Place of birth missing (living people)
1996 births
21st-century Australian women
21st-century Australian people